
Gmina Markowa is a rural gmina (administrative district) in Łańcut County, Subcarpathian Voivodeship, in south-eastern Poland.

Neighbouring gminas
Gmina Markowa is bordered by the gminas of Chmielnik, Gać, Hyżne, Jawornik Polski, Kańczuga and Łańcut.

Villages
Gmina Markowa contains the villages (sołectwos) of Husów, Markowa and Tarnawka.

References

 Polish official population figures 2006

Markowa
Łańcut County